Wallis Glacier is a glacier nearly 20 nautical miles (37 km) long in the northwest part of the Admiralty Mountains, Victoria Land. The glacier flows north and then northwest, eventually coalescing with the lower portions of Dennistoun and Nash glaciers just before all three reach the sea just east of Cape Scott. Mapped by United States Geological Survey (USGS) from surveys and U.S. Navy air photos, 1960–63. Named by Advisory Committee on Antarctic Names (US-ACAN) for Staff Sergeant Nathaniel Wallis, who perished in the crash of a C-154 Globemaster aircraft in this vicinity in 1958.

Glaciers of Pennell Coast